Babakwal railway station is located in Sheikhupura District, Pakistan.

See also
 List of railway stations in Pakistan
 Pakistan Railways

References

Railway stations in Sheikhupura District
Railway stations on Shahdara Bagh–Chak Amru Branch Line